Thai National Memorial was built for the 200th Anniversary of the Rattanakosin celebration as a memorial to the Great King in the past, and the Thai people who sacrificed their lives for the nation. The memorial is located in Khu Khot sub-district, Lam Luk Ka District, Pathum Thani Province where Vibhavadi Rangsit Road and Phahonyothin Road connected.

Objectives 

 Commemorate the sacrifices for the nation and honor the brave men forever.
 Show the history of the battle.
 Remind the public of the past and the effect on the security of the National Institute of Religion and the King.
 Provide a place to study, learn and relax.

Showcase 
Thai national memorial is separated into 5 sections

Ceremonial Ground 
The Ceremonial Ground is a space for the Honor Guard or national and international visitors. It is also used to place wreaths in various ceremonies on the ground decorated with the flags of the Royal Thai Armed Forces, the flag of the Royal Thai Police and flag of the Volunteer Guard. The side is adorned with the Thai flag and with the national flag of a visitor.

Ceremonial building 
The building was completed in November 1990 and separated into 4 floors.

Floor 1 

The first floor hosts the Hall of Honor of Her Majesty Queen Sirikit. It commends the honor and heroism of the military, police and civilian combatants that have been awarded the Ramathibodi and other medals.

 World War I simulation event : Thai troops parade through the archway in Paris.
 Indochina dispute simulation: Battle of Koh Chang
Pacific War simulation event: Flying Squadron 5
 Korean War simulation event: Battle of Pork Chop Hill
Vietnam War simulation event: War in a Vietnam forest

Floor 2 
The glass wall around the balcony was inscribed with the men who died from the battle.

Floor 3 

This floor contains models of historical events.

Floor 4 
A uniform display marks ranks and the components of the military uniform.

 The uniform display is divided into 6 exhibitions: Early Sukhothai period, Sukhothai period, Ayutthaya period, Thonburi period, early Rattanakosin period and modern era, including 15 models.
 It displays uniform components, such as the front of the shoulder strap.
 It displays four fully dressed mannequins, one each for the Army, Naval, Air force and Police.
 A data presentation with computational and videotape support. It shows the ranks and uniforms of military police.

Military History and Museum Building

Military history and museum building 

The building looks like a fortress with an ancient tower. The front of this building is the shrine of King Chulalongkorn with Thai army members standing in military uniform. Army field marshals’ names are engraved on the marble within historic buildings and a military museum.

Panoramic Display 
This building is octagonal. The inner wall is curved in a circle. A 4.30 meter by 90 meter painting is installed. It was done by Preecha Tha-ngong, a national artist, with students from Silpakorn University and Rangsit University. It shows the historical events of Thailand from past to present to represent the wisdom of the king. It includes the sacrifices of the ancestors. It is dedicated to protecting and preserving national independence.

The painting is separated into 10 parts, arranged by era:

 Establishment
 Evolution
 1st Independence and Salvage independence
 Civilization
 2nd Independence
 2nd salvage independence and Established the capital of Thonburi
 Established the capital of Rattanakosin
 Song kram kao thap (Nine Army War)
 Rescued from colonization
 Entering a new era

Outdoor museum and landscape architecture 
The outside area is separated into two parts:

Outdoor museum 

 Multi-functional area
 A fence sits between Vibhavadi Rangsit Road and  Phaholyothin Road
 Guardrooms  are on 4 sides of entrance and exit)

Landscape architecture

 Light tank type 95 HA – GO        
 T - 28 D plane
 13 Helicopters
 LVT car
 Boat inspectors river
Light Tank, Carden Loyd Mark VI, Modified
Type 63 Mountain gun
M41 light tank

References 

 Thailand, T. A. (n.d.). Attractions: The National Memorial. Retrieved January 30, 2018,
  (n.d.). Retrieved January 30, 2018, 
 อนุสรณ์สถานแห่งชาติ. (n.d.). Retrieved January 30, 2018
  (n.d.). Retrieved February 20, 2018
 Diagram of National Memorial outdoor museum http://www.thainationalmemorial.org/5_2.html

Buildings and structures in Pathum Thani province
History museums in Thailand